Attosecond physics, also known as attophysics, or more generally attosecond science, is a branch of physics that deals with light-matter interaction phenomena wherein attosecond (10−18 s) photon pulses are used to unravel dynamical processes in matter with unprecedented time resolution.

Attosecond science mainly employs pump–probe spectroscopic methods to investigate the physical process of interest. Due to the complexity of this field of study, it generally requires a synergistic interplay between state-of-the-art experimental setup and advanced theoretical tools to interpret the data collected from attosecond experiments.

The main interests of attosecond physics are:

 Atomic physics: investigation of electron correlation effects, photo-emission delay and ionization tunneling.
 Molecular physics and molecular chemistry: role of electronic motion in molecular excited states (e.g. charge-transfer processes), light-induced photo-fragmentation, and light-induced electron transfer processes.
 Solid-state physics: investigation of exciton dynamics in advanced 2D materials, petahertz charge carrier motion in solids, spin dynamics in ferromagnetic materials.
One of the primary goals of attosecond science is to provide advanced insights into the quantum dynamics of electrons in atoms, molecules and solids with the long-term challenge of achieving real-time control of the electron motion in matter.

The current world record for the shortest light-pulse generated by human technology is 43 as.

In 2022, Anne L'Huillier, Paul Corkum, Ferenc Krausz are awarded with the Wolf prize in physics for their pioneering contributions to ultrafast laser science and attosecond physics.

Introduction 
The advent of broadband solid-state titanium-doped sapphire based (Ti:Sa) lasers (1986), chirped pulse amplification (CPA) (1988), spectral broadening of high-energy pulses  (e.g. gas-filled hollow-core fiber via self-phase modulation) (1996), mirror-dispersion-controlled technology (chirped mirrors) (1994), and carrier envelop offset stabilization (2003) had enabled the creation of isolated-attosecond light pulses (generated by the non-linear process of high-harmonics generation in a noble gas) (2004,2006), which have given birth to the field of attosecond science.

Motivation to attosecond physics 
The natural time scale of electron motion in atoms, molecules, and solids is the attosecond (1 as= 10−18 s). This fact is a direct consequence of quantum mechanics laws.

Indeed, for simplicity, consider a quantum particle in superposition between ground-level, of energy , and the first excited level, of energy :

are the time-dependent ground  and excited state  respectively, with  the reduced Planck constant.

While the first two terms do not depend on time, the third, instead, does.

As a consequence, for energy levels in the range of  10 eV, which is the typical electronic energy range in matter, the characteristic time of the dynamics of any associated physical observable is approximately 400 as.

This is the reason why attosecond light pulses are used to disclose the physics of ultra-fast phenomena in the few-femtosecond and attosecond time-domain.

Generation of attosecond pulses 
To generate a traveling pulse with an ultrashort time duration, two key elements are needed: bandwidth and central wavelength of the electromagnetic wave.

From Fourier analysis, the more the available spectral bandwidth of a light pulse, the shorter, potentially, is its time duration.

There is, however, a lower-limit in the minimum duration exploitable for a given pulse central wavelength. This limit is the optical cycle.

Indeed, for a pulse centered in the low-frequency region, e.g. infrared (IR) 800 nm, its minimum time duration is around 2.67 fs, where  is the speed of light; whereas, for a light field with central wavelength in the extreme ultraviolet (XUV) at 30 nm the minimum duration is around 100 as.

Thus, a smaller time duration requires the use of shorter, and more energetic wavelength, even down to the soft-X-ray (SXR) region.

For this reason, standard techniques to create attosecond light pulses are based on radiation sources with broad spectral bandwidths and central wavelength located in the XUV-SXR range.

The most common sources that fit these requirements are free-electron lasers (FEL) and high-harmonics generation (HHG) setups.

Physical observables and attosecond experiments 
Once an attosecond light source is available, one has to drive the pulse towards the sample of interest and, then, measure its dynamics.

The most suitable experimental observables to analyze the electron dynamics in matter are:

 Angular asymmetry in the velocity distribution of molecular photo-fragment.
 Quantum yield of molecular photo-fragments.
 XUV-SXR spectrum transient absorption.
XUV-SXR spectrum transient reflectivity.
 Photo-electron kinetic energy distribution.

The general strategy is to use a pump-probe scheme to "image" through one of the aforementioned observables the ultra-fast dynamics occurring in the material under investigation.

Few-femtosecond IR-XUV/SXR attosecond pulse pump-probe experiments 
As an example, in a typical pump-probe experimental apparatus, an attosecond (XUV-SXR) pulse and an intense ( W/cm2)  low-frequency infrared pulse with a time duration of few to tens femtoseconds are collinearly focused on the studied sample.

At this point, by varying the delay of the attosecond pulse, which could be pump/probe depending on the experiment, with respect to the IR pulse (probe/pump), the desired physical observable is recorded.

The subsequent challenge is to interpret the collected data and retrieve fundamental information on the hidden dynamics and quantum processes occurring in the sample. This can be achieved with advanced theoretical tools and numerical calculations.

By exploiting this experimental scheme, several kinds of dynamics can be explored in atoms, molecules and solids; typically light-induced dynamics and out-of-equilibrium excited states within attosecond time-resolution.

Quantum mechanics foundations
Attosecond physics typically deals with non-relativistic bounded particles and employs electromagnetic fields with a moderately high intensity ( W/cm2).

This fact allows to set up a discussion in a non-relativistic and semi-classical quantum mechanics environment for light-matter interaction.

Atoms

Resolution of time dependent Schrödinger equation in an electromagnetic field 
The time evolution of a single electronic wave function in an atom,  is described by the Schrödinger equation (in atomic units):

where the light-matter interaction Hamiltonian, can be expressed in the length gauge, within the dipole approximation, as:

The formal solution of the Schrödinger equation is given by the propagator formalism:

where , is the electron wave function at time .

This exact solution cannot be used for almost any practical purpose.

However, it can be proved, using Dyson's equations that the previous solution can also be written as:

where,

The formal solution of Eq. , which previously was simply written as Eq. , can now be regarded in Eq.  as a superposition of different quantum paths (or quantum trajectory), each one of them with a peculiar interaction time  with the electric field.

In other words, each quantum path is characterized by three steps:

 An initial evolution without the electromagnetic field. This is described by the left-hand side  term in the integral.
 Then, a "kick" from the electromagnetic field,  that "excite" the electron. This event occurs at an arbitrary time that uni-vocally characterizes the quantum path .
In parallel, you also have a quantum path that do not perceive the field at all, this trajectory is indicated by the right-hand side term in Eq. .

This process is entirely time-reversible, i.e. can also occur in the opposite order.

Equation  is not straightforward to handle. However, physicists use it as the starting point for numerical calculation, more advanced discussion or several approximations.

For strong-field interaction problems, where ionization may occurs, one can imagine to project Eq.  in a certain continuum state (unbounded state or free state) , of momentum , so that:

is the probability amplitude  to find at a certain time , the electron in the continuum states .

If this probability amplitude is greater than zero than the electron is photo-ionized.

Equation  is also known as time reversed S-matrix amplitude and it gives the probability of photo-ionization by a generic time-varying electric field.

Strong field approximation (SFA) 

Strong field approximation (SFA), or Keldysh-Faisal-Reiss theory is a physical model, started in 1964 by the Russian physicist Keldysh , is currently used to describe the behavior of atoms (and molecules) in intense laser fields.

SFA is the starting theory for discussing both high-harmonic generation and attosecond pump-probe interaction with atoms.

The main assumption made in SFA is that the free-electron dynamics is dominated by the laser field, while the Coulomb potential is regarded as a negligible perturbation.

This fact re-shapes equation  into:

At this point, to keep the discussion at its basic level, lets consider an atom with a single energy level , ionization energy  and populated by a single electron (single active electron approximation).

So that,

  and 

Moreover,  we can regard the continuum states as plane wave functions state, .

This is a rather simplified assumption, a more reasonable choice would have been to use as continuum state the exact atom scattering states.

The time evolution of simple plane wave states with the Volkov Hamiltonian is given by:

here for consistency with Eq.  the evolution has already been properly converted into the length gauge.

As a consequence, the final momentum distribution of a single electron in a single-level atom, with ionization potential , is expressed as:

where,

is the dipole expectation value (or transition dipole moment), and

is the semiclassical action.

The result of Eq.  is the basic tool to understand phenomena like:

 The high-harmonics generation process, which is typically the result of strong field interaction of noble gases with an intense low-frequency pulse,  
 Attosecond pump-probe experiments with simple atoms. 
 The debate on tunneling time.

Weak Attosecond pulse-strong-IR-fields-atoms interactions 
Attosecond pump-probe experiments with simple atoms is a fundamental tool to measure the time duration of an attosecond pulse and to explore several quantum proprieties of matter. 

This kind of experiments can be easily described within strong field approximation by exploiting the results of Eq. , as discussed below.

As a simple model, consider the interaction between a single active electron in a single-level atom and two fields: an intense femtosecond infrared (IR) pulse (

and a weak attosecond pulse (centered in the extreme ultraviolet (XUV) region) .

Then, by substituting these fields to  it results

At this point, we can divide Eq.  in two contributions: direct ionization and strong field ionization (multiphoton regime), respectively.

Typically, these two terms are relevant in different energetic regions of the continuum.

Consequently, for typical experimental condition, the latter process is disregarded, and only direct ionization from the attosecond pulse is considered.

Then, since the attosecond pulse is weaker than the infrared one, it holds . Thus,  is typically neglected in Eq. .

In addition to that, we can re-write the attosecond pulse as a delayed function with respect to the IR field, .

Therefore, the probability distribution, of finding an electron ionized in the continuum with momentum , after the interaction has occurred (at  ), in a pump-probe experiments,

with an intense IR pulse and a delayed-attosecond XUV pulse, is given by:

with 

Equation  describes the photo-ionization phenomenon of two-color interaction (XUV-IR) with a single level atom and single active electron.

This peculiar result can be regarded as a quantum interference process between all the possible ionization paths, started by a delayed XUV attosecond pulse, with a following motion in the continuum states driven by a strong IR field.

The resulting 2D photo-electron (momentum, or equivalently energy, vs delay) distribution is called streaking trace.

Attosecond techniques
Here are listed and discussed some of the most common techniques and approaches pursued in attosecond research centers.

Attosecond metrology with photo-electron spectroscopy (FROG-CRAB) 

A daily challenge in attosecond science is to characterize the temporal proprieties of the attosecond pulses used in any pump-probe experiments with atoms, molecules or solids.

The most used technique is based on the frequency-resolved optical gating for a complete reconstruction of attosecond bursts (FROG-CRAB).

The  main advantage of this technique is that it allows to exploit the corroborated FROG technique, developed in 1991 for picosecond-femtosecond pulse characterization, to the attosecond field.

CRAB is an extension of FROG and it is based on the same idea for the field reconstruction.

In other words, FROG-CRAB is based on the conversion of an attosecond pulse into an electron wave-packet that is freed in the continuum by atomic photo-ionization, as already described with Eq..

The role of the low-frequency driving laser pulse( e.g. infra-red pulse) is to behave as gate for the temporal measurement.

Then, by exploring different delays between the low-frequency and the attosecond pulse a streaking trace (or streaking spectrogram) can be obtained.

This 2D-spectrogram is later analyzed by a reconstruction algorithm with the goal of retrieving both the attosecond pulse and the IR pulse, with no need of a prior knowledge on any of them.

However, as Eq.  pinpoints, the intrinsic limits of this technique is the knowledge on atomic dipole proprieties, in particular on the atomic dipole quantum phase.

The reconstruction of both the low-frequency field and the attosecond pulse from a streaking trace is typically achieved through iterative algorithms, such as:

 Principal component generalized projections algorithm (PCGPA).
 Volkov transform generalized projection algorithm (VTGPA).
 extended ptychographic iterative engine (ePIE).

See also 

 High harmonic generation
 Femtochemistry
 Femtotechnology
 Ultrashort pulse
 Chirped pulse amplification
 Free-electron laser
 Attosecond chronoscopy

References

Further reading

Attosecond groups in the world 
University of Nebraska-Lincoln
Max Planck Institute of Quantum Optics, Munich
Lund University
ELI-ALPS Szeged
Stanford University
Politecnico Milano
CEA Paris
Max Born Institute, Berlin
University of Freiburg
JAS Lab Ottawa
Imperial College London
CFEL Hamburg
ICFO Barcelona
OSU Columbus
ETH Zurich
FORTH Heraklion
Griffith University, Queensland
Weizmann Institute of science, Tel Aviv
RIKEN Tokyo
Heidelberg
University of Jena
Riyadh
ETH Zurich
Quantum mechanics
Atomic, molecular, and optical physics
Articles containing video clips
Time-resolved spectroscopy